Alexander Dunn may refer to:

 Alexander Dunn (badminton) (born 1998), Scottish badminton player
 Alexander Roberts Dunn (1833–1868), Canadian awarded the Victoria Cross